Radio Daze is the third and final album by cartoon characters Ren & Stimpy, released in 1995 through Sony Wonder, Columbia Records and Nick Records. It is a concept album where Ren and Stimpy are featured on the radio.

To promote the release of Radio Daze, Sony Wonder held a contest entitled "The King of the Airwaves". The contest ended February 1, 1996. "I Wanna Be a DJ" had an accompanying music video.

Track listing
"Opening" - 1:28
"I Wanna Be a DJ" - 3:46
"Caller #5" - 5:48
"King of the Airwaves" - 3:46
"Is Anyone Out There?" - 4:01
"On the Road" - 4:08
"Any Freeway You Take" - 5:12
"Hard Time" - 3:52
"Powdered Toastman" - 5:09
"In Hollywood" - 4:02
"Take a Walk On the Muddy Side" - 4:48
"Dead End Job" - 2:45
"Stuck with You" - 3:18

References

1995 albums
The Ren & Stimpy Show
1990s comedy albums